The name Terrell (or Terrill) is a Norman surname (now present in Ireland, Britain and USA), possibly meaning stubborn or follower of Thor, though, due to its Norman origin, either is possible. The first records of the family come with Walter Tirel III who is suspected of killing King William the II of England. The immigrant ancestor of the American branch was Richmond Terrell, who settled in New Kent County, Virginia from England in 1656. The most notable members of the family in the United States are descended either directly from him or his close relations.

Statistics
In the United States, the surname ranked as the 946th most common surname in the 2000 U.S. Census. There were 33,914 individuals recorded at that time using the surname Terrell, and of these, 57.43% identified as being white, 38.31% black, 0.27% Asian and Pacific Islander, 0.77% American Indian and Native Alaskan,  1.47% as Hispanic ethnic origin and 1.75% of more than one race.

Terrells in America

Richmond Terrell

Richmond Terrell was born in Reading, England in 1624. After his father and grandfather, he was among the third generation of descendants to use the current spelling of the surname. He emigrated to the United States in 1656 and settled in New Kent County, Virginia. His brother William Terrell (born 1629) appears to have arrived in America sometime between 1658 and 1665. It is not known whether his brother stayed in the U.S. or returned to London. Richmond had several children including a son also named William. It has been speculated that this William is the same William Terrell that later married Susannah Waters, but due to a lack of documentary evidence, this has not been proven to the satisfaction of many historians.

William Terrell who married Susannah Waters
This William Terrell was born around 1659 and died around 1743.  He married Susannah Waters and is a direct ancestor to several notable Terrells in the United States as well as other Terrell descendants including Jimmy Carter and Barack Obama. Among historians, there is a lack of consensus regarding which of the early Terrells in America he is directly descended. One theory is that he is the son of the immigrant ancestor Richmond Terrell, but he may also be descended from Richmond's brother William. Gary Boyd Roberts in his authoritative volume, Ancestors of American Presidents, covers only nine generations of Carter's ancestry (going back to Joel Terrell, William's son) and ten generations for Obama (going back to Hannah Lewis, William's granddaughter), so the issue is not addressed in their respective ahnentafel charts. In Reitwiesner's ancestry chart of Obama, despite covering sixteen generations, it does not list any ancestors for William Terrell.

Coat of arms

The coat of arms of Tyrrells of Heron, from whom the Tyrrells of Springfield and the Tyrrells of Thornton and
from whom William Tyrrell (or Terrell) of Virginia are descended is described as follows:

Arms: Argent, within a bordure engrailed, gules, two chevrons, azure.

Crest: A peacock's tail issuing from the mouth of a boar's head, couped, erect.

Supporters: Two tigers, regardant.

Motto: Sans Dieu Rien. (Without God, Nothing).

See also
Terrill
Tyrrell

References

Surnames
Surnames of French origin